Cohasset Melba Park also known as Four Oaks Park, is an urban park located in the San Fernando Valley, Los Angeles, California. It is primarily a grassy green space, with drinking fountains and a children's playground.

References

Parks in California
Parks in Los Angeles County, California
Parks in Los Angeles
West Hills, Los Angeles